Apreta is a moth genus, belonging to the family  Tineidae. It contains only one species, Apreta paradoxella, which is found in California.

References

Tineidae
Monotypic moth genera
Moths of North America
Tineidae genera